The Return of Life (transliterated as Awdat el hayat) is an Egyptian film released on August 24, 1959. The film is directed and written by Zoheir Bakir, features a screenplay co-written by Adly Nour, and stars Ahmed Ramzy, Maha Sabry, and Mahmoud el-Meliguy. The plot involves a family who lives in peace until the wife asks her husband for help with her glaucoma, leading him to seek drugs and turn the family’s life upside down.

Cast
 Ahmed Ramzy (Ahmed Abdelaziz, a lawyer)
 Maha Sabry (Semsema, Hussein’s daughter)
 Youssef Fakhr Eddine (Amin, Semsema’s brother/Zarif)
 Mahmoud el-Meliguy (Hussein Abdelfattah)
 Zeinat Sedki (Ehsan Daqdaq, a scientist)
 Samiha Ayoub (Tahia, Hussein’s wife)
 Mohamed Reda (Darwish, Tahia’s uncle from Brazil)
 Abdel Ghani Kamar (Sgt. Mustafa)
 Mohamed El Deeb (Rashid, a lawyer)
 Badr Nofal (doctor)
 Khalil Badr El Dein (Ezzat)
 Wafaa Sharif (Fatima)
 Kawther Ramzi (Ensaf)
 Ighraa (Zainab)
 Farhat Omar (Shadid)
 Laila Hamdy
 Mohamed Youssef
 Abdulhamid Badawi
 Ahmed Bali
 Samia Mohsen
 Ezzat Abduljawad
 Fouad Rateb
 Hussein Abdel Ghani
 Mutawa Owais
 Ismail Kamel
 Fayza Abdo
 Wafaa Helmy
 Salwa Rushdi
 Abdelhalim al-Nahal
 Zaki Azab
 Mahmoud Ashmawi
 Ahmed Abdelfattah
 Mahmoud Abdel Aziz
 Othman el-Miniawy (singing)

Songs

Synopsis
Hussein Abdelfattah (Mahmoud el-Meliguy), a simple worker, lives contentedly with his wife, Tahia (Samiha Ayoub), and his two children, Amin and Semsema. Tahia chafes at their life of poverty and demands that her husband bring them above it. Hussein encounters his former co-workers Ezzat (Khalil Badr El Dein), who lives in a large house but funds it through drug dealing. Police arrest Hussein and lose one of their own during the ensuing firefight, earning him a sentence of life in prison and the confiscation of his money.

Tahia moves into a small loft on Muhammad Ali Street in Cairo’s Old City with the help of her friend, a scientist named Ehsan Daqdaq (Zeinat Sedki). Her son Amin falls ill and is hospitalized, leading Tahia to suffer a nervous breakdown and be committed to a mental hospital, whence Ehsan adopts Semsema. Amin recovers and goes with Sgt. Mustafa (Abdul Ghani Kamar) to Ehsan’s house, where she refuses to see him. Ehsan runs a wedding belly dance troupe in which her daughter Zainab (Ighraa) works with two young entertainers, composer Zarif (Youssef Fakhr Eddine) and Semsema (Maha Sabry).

Darwish (Mohamed Reda), Tahia’s uncle, returns from Brazil an enriched man to find her and her children. He enlists a lawyer named Rashid (Mohamed El Deeb) to help find them after depositing 100,000 Egyptian pounds in the bank to care for them. Rashid assigns his paralegal, Ahmed Abdelaziz (Ahmed Ramzy) to handle the search. Ahmed discovers Tahia in the hospital with amnesia. Ahmed rents her a house and contacts Ehsan, who denies knowing Semsema’s whereabouts for fear of losing her as the band’s star singer. 

Tahia falls madly in love with Ahmed and accuses Semsema of stealing him from her. Hussein gets out of prison and searches for Tahia, revealing to them that Amin and Zarif are one and the same. He threatens Ehsan into confesses that Semsema is in fact Tahia’s daughter. Tahia is injured in accident that restores her memory. Ahmed marries Semsema, and the family is reunited at last.

External links
 IMDb page
 El Cinema page
 Dhliz page
 Karohat page
 “Yes, This Is It,” Song on YouTube
 Article by Wajih Nada in El Watan News
 Article by Wajih Nada in El Watan News

References

Egyptian drama films
1959 films